Craig Osika is a former American football offensive lineman in the National Football League (NFL) and is also currently a high school principal/ football head coach.

Playing career 
Osika played high school football at Hobart High School and college football at Indiana. In his career at IU he played TE, OL, RB, and even completed 107 of 108 passing attempts.

In a four-year career in the NFL from 2002 until 2005, he was with the San Francisco 49ers, Cleveland Browns, and Jacksonville Jaguars. Osika played in one regular season game for the Browns during week 7 of the 2003 season.

Coaching career 
In 2018, Osika was named the head football coach of his alma mater, Hobart High School. In 2021 he was made Co-Principal.

References

Living people
American football offensive linemen
Indiana Hoosiers football players
San Francisco 49ers players
Cleveland Browns players
1979 births
High school football coaches in Indiana
Players of American football from Indiana
People from Merrillville, Indiana